The Peace and Freedom Party (PFP) is a left-wing political party with affiliates and former members in more than a dozen American states, including California, Colorado, Florida, Hawaii, Indiana and Utah, but none now have ballot status besides California. Its first candidates appeared on the 1966 New York ballot. The Peace and Freedom Party of California was organized in early 1967, gathering over 103,000 registrants which qualified its ballot status in January 1968 under the California Secretary of State Report of Registration.

The party has appeared in other states as an antiwar and pro-civil rights organization opposed to the Vietnam War and supporting black liberation, farm-worker organizing, women's liberation, and the gay rights movement. Its presidential candidates were Leonard Peltier in 2004, Ralph Nader in  2008, Roseanne Barr in 2012 and Gloria La Riva in 2016 and 2020.

Platform  
According to its website, the party "is committed to feminism, socialism, democracy, ecology, and racial equality", advocating "to build a mass-based socialist party throughout the country". It is a strong advocate of environmentalism, aboriginal rights, rights to sexuality, government-funded health care, a woman's right to an abortion, public education, subsidized housing, and a socialist-run economy.

History

Founding 
The Peace and Freedom Party grew out of the civil rights and anti-war movements on June 23, 1967. Unhappiness with the Democratic Party's support for the war in Vietnam and the Democrats' failure to effectively support the civil rights movement were major factors in the decision to build a new party.

In the 1966 House of Representatives elections, three people ran under the Peace and Freedom Party banner. Herbert Aptheker received 3,562 votes in New York state's 12th Congressional District; Robert B. Shaw received 1,974 votes in Washington state's 7th Congressional District, and Frank Patterson received 1,105 votes in Washington state's 2nd Congressional District. Late 1966 began a number of voter registration drives in various states with the intent to build a national party. Most notably in the San Francisco Bay Area and in Los Angeles county, activists became deputy registrars of voters as peace organizers, anti-war veterans and civil rights workers.

Election of 1968 
The party achieved ballot status in California in January 1968 by registering over 105,000 voters under its banner. It later got ballot status in 13 other states, but in all of those, the election laws and small organization meant that most were unable to retain ballot status after 1968.

The PFP's first national convention to nominate candidates for president and vice president was held in Ann Arbor, Michigan on August 17 – August 18, 1968. Ric Hyland, as California PFP's National Administrator, was convention chair. Eldridge Cleaver was nominated for president over Richard C. "Dick" Gregory by a margin of 161.5 to 54. Cleaver, a convicted felon and Black Panther spokesman, was technically not eligible to run since he would not yet be 35 by the time of the inauguration in January 1969. Due to the needs of the state parties to collect signatures, the party fielded several vice presidential nominees, including Chicago activist Peggy Terry, activist Rodolfo "Corky" Gonzales, radical economist Doug Dowd and Judith Mage, who had been nominated at the national convention. Cleaver personally preferred Yippie leader Jerry Rubin. Gregory also appeared on the ballot in several states along with his vice presidential running mate Mark Lane as the Peace and Freedom Party candidate as well as in New York as the candidate of the Freedom and Peace Party. Two states (California and Utah) refused to list Cleaver on the ballot, although each state listed the presidential electors and candidates for vice president (Peggy Terry in California and Corky Gonzales in Utah).

A variety of people joined the party in its first election. Bob Avakian was a spokesman for the party in the San Francisco Area and from the north coast where artists and activists such as Emmy Lou Packard and Byron Randall were involved. New York's Peace and Freedom Party consisted of a fractious coalition of competing Marxist groups, along with libertarians led by economist Murray Rothbard. Libertarians and some anarchists briefly competed for the leadership in the California party by running against the Socialist Campaign Collective and the Unity Coalition. The convention was deadlocked when the libertarians and about a third of the Unity Coalition walked out and formed a rump convention, leaving the socialists and their feminists allies with a clear majority. Most of the Libertarians left following the walkout at the 1974 convention. At that event, the California Secretary of State ruled that the group of people who had voted to make the party feminist and socialist would be considered the official party in California since they were the ones who had remained in the convention room.

In the election of 1968, the party fared fairly well for a newly ballot qualified party. Nationally, Gregory outpolled Cleaver, receiving 47,097 votes to Cleaver's 36,623 because some states had disqualified Cleaver because of his age. In California and Utah, where no presidential nominee appeared on the ballot, the voters cast 27,887 votes for the party presidential race where the vice presidential were on the ballot. The full nationwide vote for presidential electors was 111,607. Party candidates for the Senate received a national total of 105,411 votes. In Utah, the party fielded folk singer Bruce "U Utah" Phillips for Congress who trailed with 2,019 votes. The party retained ballot status in California in the 1970 general election, which it retained for a number of years except for 1999 to 2003. In 2003, Peace and Freedom Party became the first party in the history of California to regain its ballot status.

In 1968, the party held a statewide founding convention in Richmond, California. San Francisco chair Ric Hyland, co-founder of the Radical Caucus, nominated Eldridge Cleaver for presidential candidate. Cleaver beat out Dick Gregory and Dr. Ben Spock on the basis of the slogan: We are not seeking the candidate with the broadest appeal, we seek the candidate with the deepest truth. Radical journalists Paul Jacobs and Robert Scheer were selected as the party's candidates for the U.S. Senate.

In 1970, Marge Buckley received 177,716 or 2.8% of the vote for Attorney General of California and C. T. Weber had 149,961 recorded votes (2.4%) in the vote for State Controller. By getting over 2 percent of the statewide vote, each of these candidates insured the party would maintain on the ballot through the 1974 election.

People's Party 
After 1968, the party affiliates in most states dissolved primarily because of ballot access restrictions in many states. However, the California party continued to maintain enough registered voters to hold on to its ballot status and in some partisan districts the party held the balance of power between the so-called major parties.

Throughout the 1970s and into the 1980s, the California party continued to contest local elections and sometimes win city and service district elections, most notably in Sonoma County, where it won three of the five member Cotati city seats council. Another milestone was reached when Kayren Hudiburgh of San Francisco was elected state chair in 1974 of the California party, the first woman to hold this position in any of the ballot qualified parties in the state. Hudiburgh also ran twice for the state assembly in this time period.

The California party became part of the coalition making up the national left-wing People's Party. For 1972, the People's Party nominated the feminist and democratic socialist, the noted anti-war activist Benjamin Spock for president along with Julius Hobson of the D.C. Statehood Party for vice president. In 1976, the party nominated Margaret Wright as its first woman contender for president. Wright lived in the Watts section of Los Angeles and had worked closely with the Black Panther Party. Wright was also noted as being the founder of Women Against Racism.

Recent history 
In 1998, the Peace and Freedom Party of California failed to attain more than the required two percent of the votes cast for one of its statewide candidates and was removed from the ballot as a ballot qualified party. In 2003, after a voter registration drive Peace and Freedom Party became the first ballot qualified party in California history to lose its ballot status for more than one election and then requalify for the ballot. Longtime Peace and Freedom Party activist C. T. Weber was one of 135 candidates who ran for governor in the October 2003 recall election. In this recall, voters removed then-Governor Gray Davis (a Democrat) and elected Republican Arnold Schwarzenegger. At its August 2004 state convention, the Native American activist Leonard Peltier was nominated as Peace and Freedom Party's presidential candidate. Peltier was at the time (and still is) imprisoned serving a life term for the 1975 murders of two FBI agents; the Party considers him to be a political prisoner. Party members who supported Peltier's candidacy hoped to draw attention to his case and to the effort to win a presidential pardon for Peltier.

The party again fell under the required number of registered voters to retain ballot status in February 2006 and was declared disqualified by the California Secretary of State. However, citing previous instances in which parties not meeting the ballot qualification criteria were still allowed to participate in primary elections and the fact that there had not yet been a regular gubernatorial election since the party regained its ballot status (and as such, the decision was premature), the decision to bar the party from the June 2006 Primary was reversed after less than a week.

In the 2006 California elections, two statewide Peace and Freedom Party candidates received more than the required vote, thus ensuring the party's ballot status for another four years (Elizabeth Cervantes Barron received 212,383 votes, 2.5% of the total, for Controller; and Tom Condit received 187,618 votes, 2.2% of the total, for Insurance Commissioner)-

On the March 30, 2008, the State Central Committee endorsed a plan to create a National Organizing Committee (NOC) and a national political party. The NOC was instructed to work toward a national "multi-tendency non-sectarian organization committed to socialism, democracy, feminism, environmentalism and racial equality". A national organizing conference was set for December 2008 following the general election.

A political convention was held August 2–3, 2008 in Sacramento to select the party's 2008 presidential ticket. Contending for the nomination were Gloria La Riva (also nominee of the Party for Socialism and Liberation), Cynthia McKinney (also nominee of the Green Party) Brian Moore (also nominee of the Socialist Party), and independent presidential candidate Ralph Nader, who won. The results were the following: Nader (46%), Gloria La Riva (27%), Brian Moore (10%) and Cynthia McKinney (6%). Nader's running mate, former San Francisco Supervisor Matt Gonzalez, was endorsed for vice president by acclamation. The nomination ensured that the Nader/Gonzalez presidential ticket would appear on the ballot in California for the 2008 election.

On August 6, the Nader/Gonzalez campaign submitted sufficient signatures to appear on the Iowa and Utah ballots as the Peace and Freedom Party candidate. This was the first expansion of the party beyond California since the 1970s. However, the party did not achieve the votes necessary to guarantee ballot access in Iowa and Utah in subsequent elections.

Since 1968, over 400 different candidates have sought Peace and Freedom Party nominations for public office.

In 2016, the party's California state chair wrote the California Secretary of State, asking for Jill Stein to be placed on the party's ballot.  Stein wrote as well.  She was kept off the party's California primary ballot by the Secretary of State.  The Peace and Freedom's 2016 presidential candidate Gloria La Riva was also the nominee of the Party for Socialism and Liberation.

California's 2018 gubernatorial primary had statewide office candidates registered in the party.  In the race for Insurance Commissioner, Peace and Freedom candidate Nathalie Hrizi received 316,149 votes, 5.0% of total.

In 2019, the Peace and Freedom Party in California grew from 76,784 registered voters in February to 90,121 in October. This growth of 17.4% was the highest growth rate achieved by any California political party.  On more recent registration statistic reports, the party has had only increments of registrations, up to 105,535 registrations as of February 10, 2021.

Presidential tickets 

Notes:

Congressional candidates from California 
 1968 – 7th California's congressional district, Huey P. Newton: 12,164 votes (7.5%)

California gubernatorial candidates

See also 
 List of anti-war organizations
 List of peace activists
 List of political parties in the United States

References 
 Specific

 General
 "Peace and Freedom Party from 1967 to 1997" Synthesis/Regeneration 12 (Winter 1997).
 "History of the Venice Peace and Freedom Party". John Haag. Freevenice.org. Retrieved April 4, 2005.

External links 
 

Political parties in California
1967 establishments in the United States
Anti–Vietnam War groups
Democratic socialist parties in the United States
Feminist political parties in the United States
Non-interventionist parties
Pacifist parties
Political parties established in 1967
Socialist feminist organizations
Regional and state political parties in the United States
Political parties in the United States
State and local socialist parties in the United States